Flatwood is an unincorporated community in Shannon County, in the U.S. state of Missouri.

History
The community once contained a school, the Flatwoods School.  The schoolhouse was named for flatwoods in the area.

References

Unincorporated communities in Shannon County, Missouri
Unincorporated communities in Missouri